Rudolf Gutendorf (30 August 1926 – 13 September 2019) was a German football manager, renowned for managing the highest number of national teams – a total of 18 teams plus Iran's Olympic team in 1988 and the China Olympic team in 1992.

Gutendorf holds a Guinness World Record for coaching 55 teams in 32 countries, across five continents.

Playing career
He played for TuS Neuendorf, Blue Stars Zürich and Luzern.

Coaching career 
His last coaching job was in 2003 with the Samoa national football team.

Filmography 
 1999: "Der Ball ist ein Sauhund"
 15 November 1999: "Beckmann"
 2006: "Volle Kanne – Service täglich"
 2009: "Mein Ehrgeiz galt dem Fußball und den Frauen"

References

External links
 
 Official website 
 

1926 births
2019 deaths
Sportspeople from Koblenz
People from the Rhine Province
Footballers from Rhineland-Palatinate
Association football outside forwards
German footballers
West German footballers
TuS Koblenz players
FC Luzern players
West German expatriate footballers
Expatriate footballers in Switzerland
West German expatriate sportspeople in Switzerland
West German football managers
German football managers
FC Luzern managers
US Monastir (football) managers
MSV Duisburg managers
VfB Stuttgart managers
Bermuda national football team managers
FC Schalke 04 managers
Kickers Offenbach managers
Sporting Cristal managers
Chile national football team managers
Bolivia national football team managers
Venezuela national football team managers
TSV 1860 Munich managers
Real Valladolid managers
SC Fortuna Köln managers
Trinidad and Tobago national football team managers
Grenada national football team managers
Antigua and Barbuda national football team managers
Botswana national football team managers
Tennis Borussia Berlin managers
Hamburger SV managers
Australia national soccer team managers
New Caledonia national football team managers
Nepal national football team managers
Tonga national football team managers
Tanzania national football team managers
Fiji national football team managers
Hertha BSC managers
São Tomé and Príncipe national football team managers
Tokyo Verdy managers
Ghana national football team managers
China national football team managers
Mauritius national football team managers
Zimbabwe national football team managers
Rwanda national football team managers
Samoa national football team managers
Bundesliga managers
2. Bundesliga managers
North American Soccer League (1968–1984) coaches
German expatriate football managers
Expatriate football managers in Switzerland
Expatriate football managers in Tunisia
West German expatriate sportspeople in Tunisia
Expatriate soccer managers in the United States
West German expatriate sportspeople in the United States
Expatriate football managers in Bermuda
West German expatriate sportspeople in Bermuda
Expatriate football managers in Peru
West German expatriate sportspeople in Peru
Expatriate football managers in Chile
West German expatriate sportspeople in Chile
Expatriate football managers in Bolivia
West German expatriate sportspeople in Bolivia
Expatriate football managers in Venezuela
West German expatriate sportspeople in Venezuela
Expatriate football managers in Spain
West German expatriate sportspeople in Spain
Expatriate football managers in Trinidad and Tobago
West German expatriate sportspeople in Trinidad and Tobago
Expatriate football managers in Grenada
West German expatriate sportspeople in Grenada
Expatriate football managers in Antigua and Barbuda
West German expatriate sportspeople in Antigua and Barbuda
Expatriate football managers in Botswana
West German expatriate sportspeople in Botswana
Expatriate soccer managers in Australia
West German expatriate sportspeople in Australia
Expatriate football managers in New Caledonia
West German expatriate sportspeople in New Caledonia
Expatriate football managers in Nepal
West German expatriate sportspeople in Nepal
Expatriate football managers in Tonga
Expatriate football managers in Tanzania
West German expatriate sportspeople in Tanzania
Expatriate football managers in Fiji
West German expatriate sportspeople in Fiji
Expatriate football managers in São Tomé and Príncipe
West German expatriate sportspeople in São Tomé and Príncipe
Expatriate football managers in Japan
Expatriate football managers in Ghana
Expatriate football managers in China
German expatriate sportspeople in China
Expatriate football managers in Iran
West German expatriate sportspeople in Iran
Expatriate football managers in Mauritius
German expatriate sportspeople in Mauritius
Expatriate football managers in Zimbabwe
German expatriate sportspeople in Zimbabwe
Expatriate football managers in Rwanda
German expatriate sportspeople in Rwanda
Expatriate football managers in Samoa
West German expatriate football managers
German expatriate sportspeople in Ghana
German expatriate sportspeople in Japan
German expatriates in Tonga
German expatriates in Samoa